David Ross Lonsberry (February 7, 1947 – May 4, 2014) was a Canadian professional ice hockey left winger who played 15 seasons in the National Hockey League (NHL) for the Boston Bruins, Los Angeles Kings, Philadelphia Flyers and Pittsburgh Penguins. He had his best seasons in a Flyers uniform and was a member of Philadelphia's back-to-back Stanley Cup championship teams in the mid-1970s.

Playing career
Signed with the Boston Bruins organization as a teenager, Lonsberry enjoyed an outstanding junior career with the Estevan Bruins junior club of the Saskatchewan Junior Hockey League (SJHL), winning the scoring championship in his final season with 144 points in only 60 games, and following with 23 goals in 25 playoff games en route to the Memorial Cup semifinals. Starting in 1966, Lonsberry had a three-year professional apprenticeship with the Bruins' Central Professional Hockey League farm team, the Oklahoma City Blazers, while spending some time with the NHL club in each of the three seasons.

Coveted by the Los Angeles Kings, they traded for him in 1970 for two first round draft picks, and he became a steady two-way performer for Los Angeles, scoring twenty or more goals each of his two full seasons with the Kings and being named to play in the NHL All-Star Game in 1972.  He played 82 games combined in a 78-game season with the Kings and Flyers in 1971-72.

He was acquired along with Bill Flett, Jean Potvin and Eddie Joyal by the Flyers from the Kings for Serge Bernier, Bill Lesuk and Jim Johnson on January 28, 1972. The transaction was the largest in league history at the time. He would meet with the most success with the Flyers. Playing on a line with Rick MacLeish and Gary Dornhoefer, his hard-nosed two-way style fit in perfectly with the "Broad Street Bullies," scoring over twenty goals in three of his six and a half seasons in Philadelphia and participating in both of the Flyers' Stanley Cup championships. His best season was 1974, the first such championship, where he had a career high 32 goals and followed with 13 points in 17 playoff games.

In 1978, Lonsberry was dealt for the final time to the Pittsburgh Penguins, remaining an effective player for his three years with that club. With Pittsburgh in a youth movement and declining to renew his contract, he retired after the 1981 season.

Lonsberry finished his career with 256 goals and 310 assists for 566 points in 968 games, adding 806 penalty minutes. He also played in 100 playoff games, scoring 21 goals and 25 assists.

After his playing career, Lonsberry went into the commercial insurance business in the Los Angeles area. He died of cancer on May 4, 2014.

Career statistics

References

External links
 

1947 births
2014 deaths
Boston Bruins players
Buffalo Bisons (AHL) players
Canadian ice hockey left wingers
Edmonton Oil Kings (WCHL) players
Estevan Bruins players
Ice hockey people from Saskatchewan
Los Angeles Kings players
Minneapolis Bruins players
Oklahoma City Blazers (1965–1977) players
Sportspeople from Humboldt, Saskatchewan
Philadelphia Flyers players
Pittsburgh Penguins players
Stanley Cup champions
Canadian expatriate ice hockey players in the United States